, is a former Japanese idol, actress and singer. She is best known for the role of Miki Saegusa in six Godzilla films from 1989 to 1995.

Biography
Megumi Odaka was born on May 9, 1972 in Yokohama, Kanagawa, Japan. She graduated from Horikoshi High School. Odaka is the niece of actress Mayumi Shimizu. While in junior high school, Odaka suffered from a stomach illness and low blood pressure.

The following, year she won a Japanese Academy Award for "Rookie of the Year" for her performance in this film. In 1988, she starred in the TV series Hana no Asuka-gumi! as Asuka Kuraku along with Natsuki Ozawa and Hikari Ishida, based on a manga series about a 14-year-old delinquent girl.

Godzilla series
After playing roles in a number of TV series, Odaka landed the role of Miki Saegusa in Godzilla vs. Biollante in 1989 (although her character's back story was first introduced in the manga adaptation of 1984 reboot). Toho was impressed with her acting skills and she reprised her role in the following installment and the rest of the Heisei Series. Prior to assuming the role, Odaka had never seen a Godzilla film, and was initially scared of the Godzilla suit until she befriended suit performer Kenpachiro Satsuma.

Odaka was one of the few actors to play the same role in more than one original Japanese release of a Godzilla film (Takashi Shimura played Dr. Kyouhei Yamane in the first two films, Raymond Burr reprised his role as Steve Martin in the edited American releases Godzilla, King of the Monsters! and Godzilla 1985, Yumiko Shaku starred as Akane Yashiro in Godzilla Against Mechagodzilla and returned briefly for its sequel Godzilla: Tokyo S.O.S., and finally Momoko Kochi who portrayed Emiko Yamane on the original 1954 Godzilla film reprised her role in a cameo appearance in Godzilla vs. Destroyah).

Music career
Odaka also had a short singing career from 1988 to 1991, which spawned six singles and the two albums, Milky Cotton (1988) and Powder Snow (1989). She also acted in several stage productions such as "Anne no aijou" (or "Anne no ai") aka "Anne's Love" or "Anne's Affection" in 1991, "Kiki's Delivery Service" in 1995, "Peter Pan" in 1996 and "Yana no ue no Violin-jiki" ("Violin Player on top of the Roof" or "Fiddler on the Roof") in 1994, 1996, and 1998.

Retirement
In 2000, Odaka declined a role in a stage adaptation of Phoenix (Hi no Tori) at the Osaka Shochikuza due to her illnesses. She then left Toho and announced her retirement.

Since her retirement, she took several jobs such as office work and cosmetics sales.

Personal life
Odaka is married to actor and director . Since 2012, Odaka has participated as an actress and assistant director in Ugajin's theater class .

Filmography

Film
Princess from the Moon (1987)
Godzilla vs. Biollante (1989)
Gogeza Monogatari (1991)
Godzilla vs. King Ghidorah (1991)
Godzilla vs. Mothra (1992)
Godzilla vs. Mechagodzilla II (1993)
Shoot! (1994)
Godzilla vs. SpaceGodzilla (1994)
Godzilla vs. Destoroyah (1995)
 Hoshi 35 (2023)

Television
Hana no Asuka-gumi! (1988)
Seishun Kazoku (1989)
Hey! Agari Icchou (1989)
Ikenai Joshikou Monogatari (1990)
Gekai Arimori Saeko (1990) (Episode 5)
Genji Monogatari ue no Makishita no kan (1990)
Anata Dake Mienai (1992)
Yonimo Kimyouna Monogatari – Haru no Tokubetsu-hen (1992)
Ude ni Oboe ari 2 (1992) (Episode 5)
Oushin Doctor Jiken no Karte (1992) (Episode 9)
Kaseifu wa Mita! (1992) (Episode 11)
Furuhata Ninzaburō (1996) (2nd Season – Episode 14)
Samurai Tantei Jiken (1997) (Episode 14)
Hakui no Futari (1998)
Hamidashi Keiji Jounetsu kei (2000) (4th Series – Episode 17)

Discography

Singles
 /  (March 21, 1988)
"Blue Wind" /  (July 6, 1988)
 /  (November 21, 1988)
 /  (March 21, 1989)
 /  (August 30, 1989)
 /  (February 21, 1991)

Albums
Milky Cotton (September 7, 1988)
Powder Snow (November 29, 1989)
Odaka Megumi Best (aka: Emi Odaka Best) (August 21, 2002)

Photobooks
Whisper / Sasayaki (March 30, 1989)
TRY (05.11.1989)

References

External links
 (incomplete and partly incorrect)
 (incomplete)

1972 births
Living people
Actresses from Kanagawa Prefecture
Japanese women pop singers
Japanese film actresses
Japanese television actresses
Japanese idols
Musicians from Kanagawa Prefecture
20th-century Japanese actresses
20th-century Japanese women singers
20th-century Japanese singers
21st-century Japanese actresses
Horikoshi High School alumni